The Military ranks and insignia of Chile are the military insignia used by the Chilean Armed Forces.

Comparative tables 
Officers

Enlisted

Army 
An aspiring non-commissioned officer or officer in the Chilean Army undergoes studies at these two schools, both located in the Santiago Metropolitan Region:
 Gen. Bernardo O'Higgins Military School (for officers)
 Sgt. Daniel Rebolledo Sepúlveda Army NCO School (for non-commissioned personnel)

Upon graduation, they become a commissioned officer (Ensign) or non-commissioned officer (Corporal), and then move on to the branch of his or her choice, except for newly recruited soldiers, whose primary rank is Soldado Dragonante or Soldier Dragonite, and are immediately enrolled as part of the Army NCO School in Maipú.

Military ranks (just as is the case in Ecuador) are similar to those in the Prussian and later German armies, including the Prussian  rank for officers. The "Captain General" rank, first used by Bernardo O'Higgins and later by presidents Ramón Freire and Augusto Pinochet, is now inactive.

The ranks used in the Army today are from the 2002 reorganization. It keeps the old enlisted ranks (Privates, Corporals, Sergeants and Sub-Officers) but a new General Officer rank scheme is used, with three General ranks instead of four.

Officers
Officer ranks are mostly derived from those in the German army, with some remnants from other influences. While field grade and senior grade officer rank insignia show German influence, general officer rank insignia are inspired by those used in the French Army, but in red shoulder straps with two to four white stars. However, during the Pinochet government, golden stars were used, which was changed in December 2005 during the command in chief of Juan Emilio Cheyre for return to the original design of the generals ranks.

Enlisted ranks
All Privates and Student NCOs studying in the Army NCO School wear no rank insignia.

Navy 
Ranks and rates are shown on the sleeves of all Chilean Navy summer uniforms (and on the shoulder boards on winter or summer service uniforms as well for officers and WOs only). Shoulder and sleeve ranks are inspired by those in the British Royal Navy, the French Navy and the German Navy.

All officers, active or reserve, study at the Arturo Prat Naval Academy and later in the Naval Polytechnic Academy and the Naval War Academy receive improved training and education to be promoted as well as training in his/her specialty field while all active and reserve NCOs (known in the Navy through the general term Men of the Sea) study at the Seamen's School of the Navy "Alejandro Navarette Cisnerna" and later in the Naval Polytechnic Academy and its attached and independent colleges for later specialty training.

Officers

Enlisted

Air force 
Ranks and insignia, similar to the Royal Air Force but adapted to suit the origins of the Chilean Air Force, are worn on shoulder collars and cuffs. General officers have the Condor eagle in their shoulder collars while officer cadets have a unique symbol, that of the Air Force Academy "Captain Manuel Ávalos Prado", on their shoulder collars. On the NCOs and enlistees, only Subofficer Majors and Subofficers wear both shoulder and cuff insignia, while NCO cadets wear a double capital letter E (for the Air Force Specialties School "Flight Sergeant Adolfo Menandier Rojas") on their shoulder collars alongside their unique cuff marking.

Officer ranks (SS.OO.)
The officer ranking system and insignia are similar to the RAF pattern of ranks, save for the General officer ranks, modified to suit the British style ranks, and the Colonel rank. Other ranks with foreign influences are that of Air Brigade General, a general officer rank in the French Air Force, and Air General, a general officer rank in the Spanish Air Force and the Bolivian and Colombian air forces.

Noncommissioned and enlisted ranks

Carabineros 
Commissioned officers
Officers of the Carabineros, native born or foreign officers having scholarships, start out as officer aspirants at the Carabinier Officers School "Pres. Gen. Carlos Ibanez del Campo" in Santiago, and after graduating become sublieutenants either in Chile or in their home countries. Later training is provided by the Police Sciences Academy also in Santiago, and in the aforementioned specialty schools of the force.

Enlisted personnel and non-commissioned officers
Chilean and foreign NCOs enter the service through enrollment at the Carabineros Formation School and receive further training as corporals at the Carabineros NCO Academy, both located in the Santiago Metropolitan Region, and some of them have later training at the various service schools of the Carabineros specializing in frontier defense, horsemanship and K-9 training and handling skills.

Gendarmerie 
Commissioned officers

Enlisted personnel and non-commissioned officers

Footnotes

References 

Chile
Military of Chile